Karymsk is a rural locality (a selo) in Pribaykalsky District, Republic of Buryatia, Russia. The population was 258 as of 2010. There are 2 streets.

Geography 
Karymsk is located 8 km northeast of Turuntayevo (the district's administrative centre) by road. Khalzanovo is the nearest rural locality.

References 

Rural localities in Okinsky District